James Ross Lawrence (born February 12, 1939) is a Canadian former professional baseball catcher who appeared in two major league games for the  Cleveland Indians. Although he did not have a plate appearance, he had three putouts behind the plate and committed one error.

He played his entire career with the Indians organization.

External links

1939 births
Living people
Baseball players from Hamilton, Ontario
Canadian expatriate baseball players in the United States
Charleston Indians players
Cleveland Indians players
Cocoa Indians players
Jacksonville Suns players
Major League Baseball catchers
Major League Baseball players from Canada
Minot Mallards players
Portland Beavers players
Reading Indians players
Salt Lake City Bees players